The Bunker (also Reichsbahnbunker Friedrichstraße) in Berlin-Mitte, Germany, is a listed air-raid shelter that was constructed in 1943 and is nowadays used as an art gallery and private apartment.

History and description
Originally based on plans of the architect Karl Bonatz, it was constructed in 1943 by Nazi Germany to shelter up to 3,000 Reichsbahn train passengers. There are 120 rooms on five floors. 

In May 1945, the Red Army took the building and turned it into a prisoner-of-war camp. From 1949, it was used to store textiles and from 1957, as storage for dry and tropical fruit, which is why the building was known as the Banana Bunker among East Berliners.

In the summer of 1992, it was turned into a hardcore techno and fetish club called "Bunker". Gabba, hard trance, house and breakbeat parties were held on four floors. After a police raid in 1995 the events became more irregular. A further raid in 1996 placed severe building restrictions on the tenants, causing the club to close. The annual Fuckparade began in part to protest the closing of the club; for several years, the demonstrations would start at the Bunker.

In 2001, real estate investor Nippon Development Corporation GmbH bought the building from the government. In 2002, it was the venue of the Berlin art festival "Insideout".

Boros Collection 
Christian Boros purchased the bunker for his private collection of contemporary art in 2003. He subsequently had architects Jens Casper and Petra Petersson convert the building into a  exhibition space and build a  glass-walled penthouse on the roof. The renovation work was finished in 2007. The interior design of the penthouse was featured in a 2017 Financial Times article. 

The first exhibition of the permanent collection opened in 2008, featuring selected sculptures, installations, and light and performance works by, among others, Olafur Eliasson, Elmgreen and Dragset, Robert Kusmirowski, Sarah Lucas, Tobias Rehberger, Anselm Reyle, Monika Sosnowska, Santiago Sierra, and Rirkrit Tiravanija. That show opened in 2008 and attracted 120,000 visitors during its nearly four-year run. 

Opened in 2012, "Sammlung Boros #2," features 130 works by 23 artists, including Ai Weiwei, Thea Djordjadze, Klara Liden, Wolfgang Tillmans, Cerith Wyn Evans. 

This was replaced in 2018 by "Boros Collection / Bunker #3", which includes works from the artists Martin Boyce, Andreas Eriksson, Guan Xiao, He Xiangyu, Uwe Henneken, Yngve Holen, Sergej Jensen, Daniel Josefsohn, Friedrich Kunath, Michel Majerus, Fabian Marti, Kris Martin, Justin Matherly, Paulo Nazareth, Peter Piller, Katja Novitskova, Pamela Rosenkranz, Avery Singer, Johannes Wohnseifer.

See also

List of electronic dance music venues

References

External links 
 
 Official website of the Boros collection
 Photographs of the bunker before renovation (in German)
 Photographs of the bunker(in German)
 Boros Penthouse

Nightclubs in Berlin
Heritage sites in Berlin
Nazi architecture
Bunkers in Germany
Art museums and galleries in Berlin
Buildings and structures in Mitte
Buildings and structures completed in 1943
Electronic dance music venues